An Internet Protocol Version 6 address (IPv6 address) is a numeric label that is used to identify and locate a network interface of a computer or a network node participating in a computer network using IPv6. IP addresses are included in the packet header to indicate the source and the destination of each packet. The IP address of the destination is used to make decisions about routing IP packets to other networks.

IPv6 is the successor to the first addressing infrastructure of the Internet, Internet Protocol version 4 (IPv4). In contrast to IPv4, which defined an IP address as a 32-bit value, IPv6 addresses have a size of 128 bits. Therefore, in comparison, IPv6 has a vastly enlarged address space.

Addressing methods
IPv6 addresses are classified by the primary addressing and routing methodologies common in networking: unicast addressing, anycast addressing, and multicast addressing.

A unicast address identifies a single network interface. The Internet Protocol delivers packets sent to a unicast address to that specific interface.

An anycast address is assigned to a group of interfaces, usually belonging to different nodes. A packet sent to an anycast address is delivered to just one of the member interfaces, typically the nearest host, according to the routing protocol's definition of distance. Anycast addresses cannot be identified easily, they have the same format as unicast addresses, and differ only by their presence in the network at multiple points. Almost any unicast address can be employed as an anycast address.

A multicast address is also used by multiple hosts that acquire the multicast address destination by participating in the multicast distribution protocol among the network routers. A packet that is sent to a multicast address is delivered to all interfaces that have joined the corresponding multicast group. IPv6 does not implement broadcast addressing. Broadcast's traditional role is subsumed by multicast addressing to the all-nodes link-local multicast group . However, the use of the all-nodes group is not recommended, and most IPv6 protocols use a dedicated link-local multicast group to avoid disturbing every interface in the network.

Address formats
An IPv6 address consists of 128 bits. For each of the major addressing and routing methodologies, various address formats are recognized by dividing the 128 address bits into bit groups and using established rules for associating the values of these bit groups with special addressing features.

Unicast and anycast address format

Unicast and anycast addresses are typically composed of two logical parts: a 64-bit network prefix used for routing, and a 64-bit interface identifier used to identify a host's network interface.

The network prefix (the routing prefix combined with the subnet id) is contained in the most significant 64 bits of the address. The size of the routing prefix may vary; a larger prefix size means a smaller subnet id size. The bits of the subnet id field are available to the network administrator to define subnets within the given network. The 64-bit interface identifier is automatically established randomly, obtained from a DHCPv6 server, or assigned manually. (Historically, it was automatically generated from the interface's MAC address using the modified EUI-64 format, but this method is now deprecated for privacy reasons.)

Unique local addresses are addresses analogous to IPv4 private network addresses.

The prefix field contains the binary value 1111110. The L bit is one for locally assigned addresses; the address range with L set to zero is currently not defined. The random field is chosen randomly once, at the inception of  the  routing prefix.

A link-local address is also based on the interface identifier, but uses a different format for the network prefix.

The prefix field contains the binary value 1111111010. The 54 zeroes that follow make the total network prefix the same for all link-local addresses ( link-local address prefix), rendering them non-routable.

Multicast address format

Multicast addresses are formed according to several specific formatting rules, depending on the application.

For all multicast addresses, the prefix field holds the binary value 11111111.

Currently, three of the four flag bits in the flg field are defined; the most-significant flag bit is reserved for future use.

The four-bit scope field (sc) is used to indicate where the address is valid and unique.

In addition, the scope field is used to identify special multicast addresses, like solicited node.

The sc(ope) field holds the binary value 0010 (link-local). Solicited-node multicast addresses are computed as a function of a node's unicast or anycast addresses.  A solicited-node multicast address is created by copying the last 24 bits of a unicast or anycast address to the last 24 bits of the multicast address.

Link-scoped multicast addresses use a comparable format.

Representation
An IPv6 address is represented as eight groups of four hexadecimal digits, each group representing 16 bits The groups are separated by colons. An example of an IPv6 address is:

The standards provide flexibility in the representation of IPv6 addresses. The full representation of eight four-digit groups may be simplified by several techniques, eliminating parts of the representation. In general, representations are shortened as much as possible. However, this practice complicates several common operations, namely searching for a specific address or an address pattern in text documents or streams, and comparing addresses to determine equivalence. For mitigation of these complications, the IETF has defined a canonical format for rendering IPv6 addresses in text:
 The hexadecimal digits are always compared in case-insensitive manner, but IETF recommendations suggest the use of only lower case letters. For example, 2001:db8::1 is preferred over 2001:DB8::1;
 Leading zeros in each 16-bit field are suppressed, but each group must retain at least one digit.
 The longest sequence of consecutive all-zero fields is replaced with two colons. If the address contains multiple runs of all-zero fields of the same size, to prevent ambiguities, it is the leftmost that is compressed.

These methods can lead to very short representations for IPv6 addresses.

During the transition of the Internet from IPv4 to IPv6, it is typical to operate in a mixed addressing environment. For such use cases, a special notation has been introduced, which expresses IPv4-mapped and IPv4-compatible IPv6 addresses by writing the least-significant 32 bits of an address in the familiar IPv4 dot-decimal notation, whereas the 96 most-significant bits are written in IPv6 format.

Networks
An IPv6 network uses an address block that is a contiguous group of IPv6 addresses of a size that is a power of two. The leading set of bits of the addresses are identical for all hosts in a given network, and are called the network's address or routing prefix.

Network address ranges are written in CIDR notation. A network is denoted by the first address in the block (ending in all zeroes), a slash (/), and a decimal value equal to the size in bits of the prefix.

The routing prefix of an interface address may be directly indicated with the address using CIDR notation.

Address block sizes
The size of a block of addresses is specified by writing a slash (/) followed by a number in decimal whose value is the length of the network prefix in bits. Such a block contains 2128 − 48 = 280 addresses. The smaller the value of the network prefix, the larger the block: a  block is 8 times larger than a  block.

Literal IPv6 addresses in network resource identifiers
Colon characters in IPv6 addresses may conflict with the established syntax of resource identifiers, such as URIs and URLs. The colon is conventionally used to terminate the host path before a port number. To alleviate this conflict, literal IPv6 addresses are enclosed in square brackets in such resource identifiers, for example:
http://[2001:db8:85a3:8d3:1319:8a2e:370:7348]/
When the URL also contains a port number the notation is:
https://[2001:db8:85a3:8d3:1319:8a2e:370:7348]:443/
where the trailing 443 is the example's port number.

Scoped literal IPv6 addresses (with zone index)
For addresses with other than global scope (as described in ), and in particular for link-local addresses, the choice of the network interface for sending a packet may depend on which zone the address belongs to. The same address may be valid in different zones, and in use by a different host in each of those zones. Even if a single address is not in use in different zones, the address prefixes for addresses in those zones may still be identical, which makes the operating system unable to select an outgoing interface based on the information in the routing table (which is prefix-based).

In order to resolve the ambiguity in textual addresses, a  must be appended to the address. The zone index is separated from the address by a percent sign (%). Although numeric zone indices must be universally supported, the zone index may also be an implementation-dependent string. The link-local address
fe80::1ff:fe23:4567:890a
could be expressed by
fe80::1ff:fe23:4567:890a%eth2

or:
fe80::1ff:fe23:4567:890a%3
The former (using an interface name) is customary on most Unix-like operating systems (e.g., BSD, Linux, macOS).
The latter (using an interface number) is the standard syntax on Microsoft Windows, but as support for this syntax is mandatory, it is also available on other operating systems.

BSD-based operating systems (including macOS) also support an alternative, non-standard syntax, where a numeric zone index is encoded in the second 16-bit word of the address. E.g.:
fe80:3::1ff:fe23:4567:890a

In all operating systems mentioned above, the zone index for link-local addresses actually refers to an interface, not to a zone. As multiple interfaces may belong to the same zone (e.g. when connected to the same network), in practice two addresses with different zone identifiers may actually be equivalent, and refer to the same host on the same link.

When used in uniform resource identifiers (URI), the use of the percent sign causes a syntax conflict, therefore it must be escaped via percent-encoding, e.g.:
http://[fe80::1ff:fe23:4567:890a%25eth0]/

Literal IPv6 addresses in UNC path names
In Microsoft Windows operating systems, IPv4 addresses are valid location identifiers in Uniform Naming Convention (UNC) path names. However, the colon is an illegal character in a UNC path name. Thus, the use of IPv6 addresses is also illegal in UNC names. For this reason, Microsoft implemented a transcription algorithm to represent an IPv6 address in the form of a domain name that can be used in UNC paths. For this purpose, Microsoft registered and reserved the second-level domain ipv6-literal.net on the Internet (although they gave up the domain in January 2014).  IPv6 addresses are transcribed as a hostname or subdomain name within this namespace, in the following fashion:
2001:db8:85a3:8d3:1319:8a2e:370:7348
is written as
2001-db8-85a3-8d3-1319-8a2e-370-7348.ipv6-literal.net
This notation is automatically resolved locally by Microsoft software, without any queries to DNS name servers.

If the IPv6 address contains a zone index, it is appended to the address portion after an 's' character:
fe80::1ff:fe23:4567:890a%3
is written as

fe80--1ff-fe23-4567-890as3.ipv6-literal.net

Address scopes
Every IPv6 address, except the unspecified address, has a scope, which specifies in which part of the network it is valid.

Unicast
For unicast addresses, two scopes are defined: link-local and global.

Link-local addresses and the loopback address have link-local scope, which means they can only be used on a single directly attached network. All other addresses (including Unique local addresses) have global (or universal) scope, which means they are potentially globally routable and can be used to connect to addresses with global scope anywhere, or to addresses with link-local scope on the directly attached network.

Unique local addresses have global scope, but they are not globally administered. As a result, only other hosts in the same administrative domain (e.g., an organization), or within a cooperating administrative domain are able to reach such addresses, if properly routed. As their scope is global, these addresses are valid as a source address when communicating with any other global-scope address, even though it may be impossible to route packets from the destination back to the source.

Anycast

Anycast addresses are syntactically identical to and indistinguishable from unicast addresses. Their only difference is administrative. Scopes for anycast addresses are therefore the same as for unicast addresses.

Multicast

For multicast addresses, the four least-significant bits of the second address octet identify the address scope, i.e. the domain in which the multicast packet should be propagated. Predefined and reserved scopes are:

All other scopes are unassigned and available to administrators for defining additional regions.

Address space

General allocation
The management of IPv6 address allocation process is delegated to the Internet Assigned Numbers Authority (IANA) by the Internet Architecture Board and the Internet Engineering Steering Group. Its main function is the assignment of large address blocks to the regional Internet registries (RIRs), which have the delegated task of allocation to network service providers and other local registries. The IANA has maintained the official list of allocations of the IPv6 address space since December 1995.

In order to allow efficient route aggregation, thereby reducing the size of the Internet routing tables, only one-eighth of the total address space is currently allocated for use on the Internet. The rest of the IPv6 address space is reserved for future use or for special purposes.

The RIRs assign smaller blocks to local Internet registries that distribute them to users. Global unicast assignment records can be found at the various RIRs or other websites. 

IPv6 addresses are assigned to organizations in much larger blocks as compared to IPv4 address assignments—the recommended allocation is a  block which contains 280 addresses, being 248 or about  times larger than the entire IPv4 address space of 232 addresses and about  times larger than the  blocks of IPv4 addresses, which are the largest allocations of IPv4 addresses.

Each RIR can divide each of its multiple  blocks into 512  blocks, typically one for each ISP; an ISP can divide its  block into   blocks, typically one for each customer; customers can create   networks from their assigned  block, each having 264 (18,446,744,073,709,551,616) addresses. In contrast, the entire IPv4 address space has only 232 (exactly 4,294,967,296 or about ) addresses.

By design, only a very small fraction of the address space will actually be used. The large address space ensures that addresses are almost always available, which makes the use of network address translation (NAT) for the purposes of address conservation completely unnecessary. NAT has been increasingly used for IPv4 networks to help alleviate IPv4 address exhaustion.

Special allocation
Provider-independent address space is assigned directly to the end user by the RIRs from the special range  and allows customers to make provider changes without renumbering their networks.

Root name servers have been assigned addresses from the range .

Reserved anycast addresses
The lowest address within each subnet prefix (the interface identifier set to all zeroes) is reserved as the "subnet-router" anycast address. Applications may use this address when talking to any one of the available routers, as packets sent to this address are delivered to just one router.

The 128 highest addresses within each  subnet prefix are reserved to be used as anycast addresses. These addresses usually have the first 57 bits of the interface identifier set to 1, followed by the 7-bit anycast ID.  Prefixes for the network can be of any length for routing purposes, but subnets are required to have a length of 64 bits. The address with value 0x7e in the 7 least-significant bits is defined as a mobile IPv6 home agents anycast address. The address with value 0x7f (all bits 1) is reserved and may not be used. No more assignments from this range are made, so values 0x00 through 0x7d are reserved as well.

Special addresses

There are a number of addresses with special meaning in IPv6. They represent less than 2% of the entire address space:

Unicast addresses

Default route

Unspecified address
Routers must not forward packets with the unspecified address.Applications may be listening on one or more specific interfaces for incoming connections, which are shown in listings of active internet connections by a specific IP address (and a port number, separated by a colon). When the unspecified address is shown it means that an application is listening for incoming connections on all available interfaces.

Local addresses
The least significant 64 bits were previously chosen as the interface hardware address constructed in modified EUI-64 format, but are now pseudo-random values for privacy. A link-local address is required on every IPv6-enabled interface—in other words, applications may rely on the existence of a link-local address even when there is no IPv6 routing.

Unique local addresses
  — Unique local addresses (ULAs) are intended for local communication (comparable to IPv4 private addresses ,  and ).They are routable only within a set of cooperating sites. The block is split into two halves. The lower half of the block was intended for globally allocated prefixes, but an allocation method has yet to be defined. The upper half is used for "probabilistically unique" addresses in which the  prefix is combined with a 40-bit locally generated pseudorandom number to obtain a  private prefix. The way in which such a 40-bit number is chosen results in only a negligible chance that two sites that wish to merge or communicate with each other will use the same 40-bit number, and thus use the same  prefix.

Transition from IPv4
  — This prefix is used for IPv6 transition mechanisms and designated as an IPv4-mapped IPv6 address.With a few exceptions, this address type allows the transparent use of the transport layer protocols over IPv4 through the IPv6 networking application programming interface. Server applications only need to open a single listening socket to handle connections from clients using IPv6 or IPv4 protocols. IPv6 clients will be handled natively by default, and IPv4 clients appear as IPv6 clients at their IPv4-mapped IPv6 address. Transmission is handled similarly; established sockets may be used to transmit IPv4 or IPv6 datagram, based on the binding to an IPv6 address, or an IPv4-mapped address.

  — A prefix used for IPv4-translated addresses.These are used by the Stateless IP/ICMP Translation (SIIT) protocol.
  — The "Well-Known" Prefix.Addresses with this prefix are used for automatic IPv4/IPv6 translation.

  — A prefix for locally translated IPv4/IPv6 addresses.Addresses with this prefix can be used for multiple IPv4/IPv6 translation mechanisms like NAT64 and SIIT.It is defined in RFC8215 and compared to 64:ff9b::/96 it contains the IPv4 address in position 48-63 and 72-87 (see RFC6052). This means that for every IPv4 address a /80 IPv6 prefix is assigned to the device. This enables similar use cases as 6to4, where a single public IPv4 address gets translated into a prefix. This way only one level of NAT is required and the devices do not need to do NAT66 internally if they need additional addresses e.g. for P2P interfaces or docker containers.
  
  — This prefix was used for 6to4 addressing (an address from the IPv4 network  was also used).The 6to4 addressing scheme is deprecated.

Special-purpose addresses
Three assignments from this block are currently assigned:
  — Used for Teredo tunneling.
  — ORCHIDv2 (Overlay Routable Cryptographic Hash Identifiers).These are non-routed IPv6 addresses used for Cryptographic Hash Identifiers.

Documentation 

Discard
  — This prefix is used for discarding traffic.

Deprecated and obsolete addresses

Multicast addresses
The multicast addresses  where  is any hexadecimal value are reserved and should not be assigned to any multicast group. The Internet Assigned Numbers Authority (IANA) manages address reservations.

Some common IPv6 multicast addresses are the following:

Solicited-node multicast address
The least significant 24 bits of the solicited-node multicast address group ID are filled with the least significant 24 bits of the interface's unicast or anycast address. These addresses allow link layer address resolution via Neighbor Discovery Protocol (NDP) on the link without disturbing all nodes on the local network. A host is required to join a solicited-node multicast group for each of its configured unicast or anycast addresses.

Stateless address autoconfiguration
On system startup, a node automatically creates a link-local address on each IPv6-enabled interface, even if globally routable addresses are manually configured or obtained through "configuration protocols" (see below). It does so independently and without any prior configuration by stateless address autoconfiguration (SLAAC), using a component of the Neighbor Discovery Protocol. This address is selected with the prefix .

In IPv4, typical "configuration protocols" include DHCP or PPP. Although DHCPv6 exists, IPv6 hosts normally use the Neighbor Discovery Protocol to create a globally routable unicast address: the host sends router solicitation requests and an IPv6 router responds with a prefix assignment.

The lower 64 bits of these addresses are populated with a 64-bit interface identifier. This should be a pseudo-random number for privacy reasons. The old modified EUI-64 format is now deprecated. Also for privacy reasons, the interface identifier is different for each automatically configured address of that interface. This has the disadvantage that multiple multicast groups need to be joined for neighbor discovery. For this, a multicast address is used, formed from the network prefix  and the 24 least significant bits of the address.

Modified EUI-64
A 64-bit interface identifier was previously derived from the interface's 48-bit MAC address, although this method is now deprecated . A MAC address  is turned into a 64-bit EUI-64 by inserting  in the middle: . When this EUI-64 is used to form an IPv6 address, it is modified: the meaning of the Universal/Local bit (the 7th most significant bit of the EUI-64, starting from 1) is inverted, so that a 1 now means Universal. To create an IPv6 address with the network prefix  it yields the address  (with the Universal/Local bit, the second-least-significant bit of the underlined quartet, inverted to 1 in this case because the MAC address is universally unique).

Duplicate address detection
The assignment of a unicast IPv6 address to an interface involves an internal test for the uniqueness of that address using Neighbor Solicitation and Neighbor Advertisement (ICMPv6 type 135 and 136) messages.  While in the process of establishing uniqueness an address has a tentative state.

The node joins the solicited-node multicast address for the tentative address (if not already done so) and sends neighbor solicitations, with the tentative address as target address and the unspecified address as source address.  The node also joins the all-hosts multicast address , so it will be able to receive Neighbor Advertisements.

If a node receives a neighbor solicitation with its own tentative address as the target address, then that address is not unique. The same is true if the node receives a neighbor advertisement with the tentative address as the source of the advertisement. Only after having successfully established that an address is unique may it be assigned and used by an interface.

When an anycast address is assigned to an interface, like a subnet-router anycast address, duplicate address detection is not performed. This is due to the inherent non-uniqueness of this type of addresses.

Address lifetime
Each IPv6 address that is bound to an interface has a fixed lifetime. Lifetimes are infinite, unless configured to a shorter period. There are two lifetimes that govern the state of an address: the preferred lifetime and the valid lifetime. Lifetimes can be configured in routers that provide the values used for autoconfiguration, or specified when manually configuring addresses on interfaces.

When an address is assigned to an interface it gets the status "preferred", which it holds during its preferred-lifetime. After that lifetime expires the status becomes "deprecated" and no new connections should be made using this address. The address becomes "invalid" after its valid-lifetime also expires; the address is removed from the interface and may be assigned somewhere else on the Internet.

Note: In most cases, the lifetime does not expire because new Router Advertisements (RAs) refresh the timers. But if there are no more RAs, eventually the preferred lifetime elapses and the address becomes "deprecated".

Temporary addresses
The globally unique and static MAC addresses, used by stateless address autoconfiguration to create interface identifiers, offer an opportunity to track user equipment—across time and IPv6 network prefix changes—and so users. To reduce the prospect of a user identity being permanently tied to an IPv6 address portion, a node may create temporary addresses with interface identifiers based on time-varying random bit strings and relatively short lifetimes (hours to days), after which they are replaced with new addresses.

Temporary addresses may be used as source address for originating connections, while external hosts use a public address by querying the Domain Name System.

Network interfaces configured for IPv6 use temporary addresses by default in OS X Lion and later Apple systems as well as in Windows Vista, Windows 2008 Server and later Microsoft systems.

Cryptographically generated addresses
As a means to enhance security for Neighbor Discovery Protocol cryptographically generated addresses (or CGAs) were introduced in 2005 as part of the Secure Neighbor Discovery (SEND) Protocol.

Such an address is generated using two hash functions that take several inputs.
The first uses a public key and a random modifier; the latter being incremented repeatedly until a specific amount of zero bits of the resulting hash is acquired.
(Comparable with the 'proof of work' field in Bitcoin mining.)
The second hash function takes the network prefix and the previous hash value.
The least significant 64 bits of the second hash result is appended to the 64-bit network prefix to form a 128-bit address.

The hash functions can also be used to verify if a specific IPv6 address satisfies the requirement of being a valid CGA.
This way, communication can be set up between trusted addresses exclusively.

Stable privacy addresses
The use of stateless autoconfigured addresses has serious implications for security and privacy concerns, because the underlying hardware address (most typically the MAC address) is exposed beyond the local network, permitting the tracking of user activities and correlation of user accounts to other information. It also permits vendor-specific attack strategies, and reduces the size of the address space for searching for attack targets.

Stable privacy addresses were introduced to remedy these shortcomings. They are stable within a specific network but change when moving to another, to improve privacy. They are chosen deterministically, but randomly, in the entire address space of the network.

Generation of a stable privacy address is based on a hash function that uses several stable parameters. It is implementation specific, but it is recommended to use at least the network prefix, the name of the network interface, a duplicate address counter, and a secret key. The resulting hash value is used to construct the final address: Typically the 64 least significant bits are concatenated to the 64-bit network prefix, to yield a 128-bit address. If the network prefix is smaller than 64 bits, more bits of the hash are used. If the resulting address does not conflict with existing or reserved addresses, it is assigned to the interface.

Default address selection
IPv6-enabled network interfaces usually have more than one IPv6 address, for example, a link-local and a global address. They may also have temporary addresses that change after a certain lifetime has expired. IPv6 introduces the concepts of address scope and selection preference, yielding multiple choices for source and destination address selections in communication with another host.

The preference selection algorithm selects the most appropriate address to use in communications with a particular destination, including the use of IPv4-mapped addresses in dual-stack implementations. It uses a configurable preference table that associates each routing prefix with a precedence level. The default table has the following content:

The default configuration places preference on IPv6 usage, and selects destination addresses within the smallest possible scope, so that link-local communication is preferred over globally routed paths when otherwise equally suitable. The prefix policy table is similar to a routing table, with the precedence value serving as the role of a link cost, where higher preference is expressed as a larger value. Source addresses are preferred to have the same label value as the destination address. Addresses are matched to prefixes based on the longest matching most-significant bit-sequence. Candidate source addresses are obtained from the operating system and candidate destination addresses may be queried via the Domain Name System (DNS).

For minimizing the time of establishing connections when multiple addresses are available for communication, the Happy Eyeballs algorithm was devised. It queries the Domain Name System for IPv6 and IPv4 addresses of the target host, sorts candidate addresses using the default address selection table, and tries to establish connections in parallel. The first connection that is established aborts current and future attempts to connect to other addresses.

Domain Name System
In the Domain Name System, hostnames are mapped to IPv6 addresses by AAAA resource records, so-called quad-A records.
For reverse lookup the IETF reserved the domain ip6.arpa, where the name space is hierarchically divided by the 1-digit hexadecimal representation of nibble units (4 bits) of the IPv6 address.

As in IPv4, each host is represented in the DNS by two DNS records: an address record and a reverse mapping pointer record. For example,
a host computer named derrick in zone example.com has the Unique Local Address . Its quad-A address record is
 derrick.example.com.  IN  AAAA  fdda:5cc1:23:4::1f
and its IPv6 pointer record is
 f.1.0.0.0.0.0.0.0.0.0.0.0.0.0.0.4.0.0.0.3.2.0.0.1.c.c.5.a.d.d.f.ip6.arpa.  IN  PTR   derrick.example.com.
This pointer record may be defined in a number of zones, depending on the chain of delegation of authority in the zone d.f.ip6.arpa.

The DNS protocol is independent of its transport layer protocol. Queries and replies may be transmitted over IPv6 or IPv4 transports regardless of the address family of the data requested.

Historical notes

Deprecated and obsolete addresses

 The site-local prefix  specifies that the address is valid only within the site network of an organization. It was part of the original addressing architecture in December 1995, but its use was deprecated in September 2004 because the definition of the term site was ambiguous, which led to confusing routing rules. New networks must not support this special type of address. In October 2005, a new specification replaced this address type with unique local addresses.
 The address block  was defined as an OSI NSAP-mapped prefix set in August 1996, but was deprecated in December 2004.
 The 96-bit zero-value prefix , originally known as IPv4-compatible addresses, was mentioned in 1995 but never fully described. This range of addresses was used to represent IPv4 addresses within an IPv6 transition technology. Such an IPv6 address has its first (most significant) 96 bits set to zero, while its last 32 bits are the IPv4 address that is represented. In February 2006, the Internet Engineering Task Force (IETF) deprecated the use of IPv4-compatible addresses. The only remaining use of this address format is to represent an IPv4 address in a table or database with fixed size members that must also be able to store an IPv6 address.
 Address block  was allocated for test purposes for the 6bone network in December 1998. Prior to that, the address block  was used for this purpose.  Both address blocks were returned to the address pool in June 2006.
 Due to operational problems with 6to4 the use of address block  is diminishing, since the 6to4 mechanism is deprecated since May 2015. Although IPv4 address block  is deprecated,  is not.
 In April 2007 the address block  was assigned for Overlay Routable Cryptographic Hash Identifiers (ORCHID). It was intended for experimental use. In September 2014 a second version of ORCHID was specified, and with the introduction of block  the original block was returned to IANA.

Miscellaneous
 For reverse DNS lookup, IPv6 addresses were originally registered in the DNS zone ip6.int, because it was expected that the top-level domain arpa would be retired. In 2000, the Internet Architecture Board (IAB) reverted this intention, and decided in 2001 that arpa should retain its original function. Domains in ip6.int were moved to ip6.arpa and zone ip6.int was officially removed on 6 June 2006.
 In March 2011, the IETF refined the recommendations for allocation of address blocks to end sites. The ARIN, RIPE & APNIC regional registries' policies encourage  assignments where appropriate.
 Originally, two proposals existed for translating domain names to IPv6 addresses: one using AAAA records, the other using A6 records. AAAA records, the method that prevailed, are comparable to A records for IPv4, providing a simple mapping from hostname to IPv6 address. The method using A6 records used a hierarchical scheme, in which the mapping of subsequent groups of address bits was specified by additional A6 records, providing the possibility to renumber all hosts in a network by changing a single A6 record. As the perceived benefits of the A6 format were not deemed to outweigh the perceived costs, the method was moved to experimental status in 2002, and finally to historic status in 2012.
 In 2009, many DNS resolvers in home-networking NAT devices and routers were found to handle AAAA records improperly. Some of these simply dropped DNS requests for such records, instead of properly returning the appropriate negative DNS response. Because the request is dropped, the host sending the request has to wait for a timeout to trigger. This often causes a slow-down when connecting to dual-stack IPv6/IPv4 hosts, as the client software will wait for the IPv6 connection to fail before trying IPv4.

Notes

References

External links
IP Version 6 multicast addresses
 
  This humorous RFC specifies an alternative way of representing IPv6 addresses, using a base-85 encoding.

Address
 IPv6 address